Spearman is a surname. Notable people with the surname include:

Alexander Spearman (1901–1982), British Member of Parliament
Sir Alexander Young Spearman, 1st Baronet (1793–1874), British civil servant
Armegis Spearman (born 1978), American football linebacker
Charles Spearman (1863–1945)), English psychologist and statistician
Clyde Spearman (fl. 1932–1946), American baseball player
Craig Spearman (born 1972), New Zealand cricketer
Doug Spearman (born 1962), American actor
Frank H. Spearman (1859–1937), American author known for his works on railroads
Glenn Spearman (1947–1998), American saxophonist
John Spearman (1824 – after 1901), American iron manufacturer
Thomas David Spearman (born 1937), Irish mathematical physicist

References